Star Wars: Galaxy of Fear is a series of 12 young adult, science fiction horror novels set in the Star Wars galaxy six months after Star Wars: Episode IV – A New Hope. The series was written by John Whitman, and released from February 1997 through to October 1998. The books ranged from 100 pages to 200 pages in large print.

Summary
The books tell the stories of three people and a droid: Tash Arranda, Zak Arranda, their Shi'ido uncle Mammon Hoole, and his droid DV-9. Tash and Zak are young survivors of the destruction of Alderaan, two Force-sensitive children who are trying to hide from the Galactic Empire while investigating the lost histories of the Jedi. 

The first six books form an arc. The protagonists discover pieces of a large Imperial experiment in biological weapons, codenamed Project Starscream. The first six books deal with the heroes discovering the various components of Project Starscream, each dangerous in its own right. 

The next six books lacked a central arc. The protagonists, now wanted fugitives, travel from planet to planet attempting to avoid Imperial authorities and stumbling into danger and the resulting adventure.

Eaten Alive
Tash and Zak Arranda are preteen siblings whose parents were killed when the Galactic Empire destroyed their home planet of Alderaan. With nowhere else to go, they began to travel with their Uncle Hoole, a mysterious shape-shifting Shi'ido who studies different species on many planets. With him they live on his starship, the Lightrunner, and learn from their new caretaker droid, DV-9. When they travel to the mysterious planet of D'vouran, they are pulled out of hyperspace, seemingly too soon, by the planet's gravity and crash land at the spaceport. Though Tash feels bad things about the planet, the Enzeen, the alien race who live on the planet, are more than happy to help out with anything they need while on the planet. D'vouran has become a tourist destination and the Enzeen hope to bring more people to live on the planet. When Chood, the Enzeen who personally helps the family, brings them to an inn to find help in repairing the engine, they are attacked and the children taken captive by the forces of Shada the Hutt, who demands Hoole's service. With help from the Rebels who are also investigating the planet, Shada's forces release the children.  Outside of the inn they meet Kevreb Bebo, a disgraced pilot who tries to warn the people staying on planet that people are disappearing. When their Uncle Hoole leaves them with Chood while he is studying, Tash sees an alien creature standing over a sleeping Zak. Waking him, they run to town to warn the others, only to find that no one is chasing them. After Hoole speaks to them, Tash stops worrying about the planet and who is chasing them.

The next day, Zak, while alone, is attacked by Shada's forces. Bebo is there also, and manages to evade all their laser shots at him. Hoole is eventually able to stop Shada, but Tash convinces him to let her speak with Bebo. He brings her, accompanied by DV-9, to a cave where he shows her a laboratory which had long ago been abandoned. He shows her a seemingly bottomless pit, which she feels there is something wrong with, and he shows her his medallion, a device which apparently keeps him safe from the disappearances. Believing him, she tries to return to the town. He gives her his medallion, but after she has gone, he is killed by one of Shada's guards. As she returns to town, she is attacked by the Enzeen, who have become parasitic monsters, but manages to escape, when an earthquake shakes the ground. Back at town, however, everyone is missing, and she goes to Shada's fortress, thinking he has done something. There she finds Zak in captivity. With DV-9's help they escape Shada's fortress, but are recaptured easily. However, now outside the fortress, Shada, his guards, and the children are attacked by the Enzeen and the planet, as holes begin to open up and take people into the planet. Shada, on his repulsor sled and the children, protected by the medallion, are kept safe, but are brought by the Enzeen to the heart of the planet, the pit Bebo showed Tash. There it is revealed that the planet is alive and needs nourishment and the Enzeen get their own nourishment from the planet while attracting more people to come. The medallion created a forcefield around the wearers that the planet couldn't absorb. When Hoole, who was disguised as an Enzeen, gets the medallion, he throws it into the pit, causing the planet to begin to erupt. Able to escape the pit, even as Shada falls in and is absorbed, they finally reach their ship. The ship, however, is unable to take-off as the planet has grabbed hold of it. Losing hope, the Millennium Falcon comes to their rescue and with deft flying by Han Solo, is finally able to escape the planet, which collapses on itself behind them.

City of the Dead
The Millennium Falcon drops off Tash, Zak and Hoole at the beginning, indicating that City of the Dead takes place mere days after Eaten Alive.  The family proceeds to buy a new ship afterwards. During the book, Zak is buried alive in a tomb. The characters, Boba Fett and Doctor Evazan are featured.

Planet Plague
Hoole takes Zack and Tash to Gobindi which is known for its ancient ruins. After Tash is infected by a mysterious virus, Wedge Antilles helps them investigate. The group learns that their recent unpleasant encounters have all been the work of a Shi'ido named Borborygmus Gog.

The Nightmare Machine
Zak and Tash visit a family friendly theme park called 'Hologram Fun World' to relax while Hoole continues his work. They discover that the attraction, the 'Nightmare Machine', which manifests seemingly harmless versions of your worst fears, is far more than it seems. For one, the voice code to end the simulation is broken.

Lando Calrissian appears, interested in purchasing the theme park. Hologram Fun World has been mentioned in a New Jedi Order novel.

Ghost of the Jedi
Tash, Zak, and their uncle Hoole are fleeing from the threat of the Imperial scientist Borborygmus Gog. There seems to be safe refuge on Nespis 8, an abandoned space station. This place also once housed a Jedi library. According to the group's ally, Deevee, the library is still there, along with the ghost of a Jedi. The station also holds the hope to stopping Gog and a threat far worse than a disturbed Jedi spirit.

Army of Terror
This book is the final chapter of the "Project Starscream" story arc.
Princess Leia, Han Solo, Chewbacca, Luke Skywalker, and C-3PO all make an appearance in the book as they attempt to stop Project Starscream. Their appearance in the book is apparently prior to their relocation to Hoth.

The shadow creatures inhabiting Kiva were reduced to that state by an accident caused by Gog and Hoole.  Little is said about the connection between Gog and Hoole, but they once worked together, which is interesting because they are both Shi'idos.

Gog's weapon is disguised as an innocent baby, with a bruise on his forehead, named "Eppon".  Many people left alone with the baby mysteriously disappear.  The baby also grows at an alarming rate and quickly matures into an adult. When the Rebels find an imperial lab, they also find Gog, who reveals that Hoole's full name is Mammon Hoole, who the Shadows had been talking about. Then, it is revealed that Eppon is really an imperial Bio-weapon. Eppon turns into a giant monster which tries to eat Hoole. Tash convinces Eppon to turn on Gog, who promptly blows Eppon up with a control he had in his coat, much to Tash's dismay. The Shadows burst in to kill Hoole, when suddenly the computer in the lab is turned on, revealing that it was Gog who rigged an experiment to make the power of a star in a test tube fail, and as a result it was Gog who created the Shadows. Gog is promptly killed by the Shadows immediately afterward.

The Brain Spiders
Many canonical characters and elements appear in The Brain Spiders such as Jabba the Hutt and Bib Fortuna. The brain spider the title references can be seen in Return of the Jedi.

A murderer who carves a K into his victims is imprisoned in Jabba's palace, when the story begins.  A prisoner tricks Zak into believing that he is innocent, and Zak lets him escape.  This is presumed to be the same murderer.  Later, Zak thinks he sees Tash kill someone and carve the same K.  This is explained when a brain spider spells out "IM TASH" in sand, suggesting that the murderer's brain was placed in Tash's body and that Tash's brain was placed in a spider.

Tash tries to develop her sense of the force at the Sarlacc pit.

The Swarm
Grand Admiral Thrawn appears in the story.  Zak, Tash and Hoole wisely decide not to board his Star Destroyer when given the chance. Zak was not responsible for the swarm, as a pile of dead shreevs was discovered at the end of the story.

Spore
Spore was imprisoned on an asteroid.  When the vault on the asteroid is broken, Zak notices that it was designed as a prison because of the way the doors opened.  Spore later infects a number of characters, temporarily. Jerec appears and claims to be an imperial officer.

The Doomsday Ship

All unfortunate events that took place on the Star of Empire, were orchestrated by a supercomputer (SIM?) designed as a harmless autopilot for the ship.  The computer seemingly had its own agenda, when it forced the evacuation of most passengers by falsely warning them of a critical meltdown.

The rebel Dash Rendar, meets the protagonists of the story, but Zak and Tash do not trust him as much as other rebels.

The computer communicates with Zak and Tash frequently. A large part of the book is written in a font specifically devoted to the computer's speech.  Zak and Tash trusted the computer for most of the story and only discovered its sinister motives at the end.

Doomsday Ship is notable for having an intentionally unresolved ending.  When Tash and Zak, think they have deactivated the computer, it turns itself back on and rectifies its own errors.

Clones
After landing on Dantooine, Tash investigates an abandoned Jedi fortress used in forgotten experiments with cloning. Throughout the work she comes across many clones, including those of various Rebels, Darth Vader, her family, and herself. Unfortunately, the clones mental instability and a malevolent, third entity combine to create a dangerous environment which she will have to escape.

The Hunger

A survey team crash-lands on an unknown planet. The planet is dark, and its fetid swamps are filled with flesh-eating flowers, fearsome swamp slugs, and deadly dragonsnakes. No one hears the survey team's distress signals. They are stranded.

Thirty years later, Zak, Tash, and their uncle Hoole, with Boba Fett in hot pursuit, land on Dagobah. Descendants of the survey team—half-starved and crazed with strange fevers—are still alive, but their methods of survival are worrying. They call themselves the Children.

See also
 Goosebumps

External links
 Star Wars Cargo Bay Page
Official CargoBay Listing
Official CargoBay Listing
Official CargoBay Listing
Official CargoBay Listing
Official CargoBay Listing

American horror novels
American science fiction novels
Book series introduced in 1997
Fiction about shapeshifting
Horror novel series
Juvenile series
Science fiction book series
Science fiction horror novels
Series of books
Star Wars Legends novels